P.J. (UK re-release title: New Face in Hell) is a 1968 American neo-noir mystery film directed by John Guillermin and starring George Peppard.

Plot
New York City private eye P.J. (Peter Joseph) Detweiler needs the work, so he accepts an offer to be a bodyguard to protect Maureen Preble, the mistress of shady millionaire William Orbison.

Orbison takes the family to the Bahamas, where a romantic attachment between P.J. and the married Maureen seems to be growing. Orbison's business partner, Grenoble, is shot dead and P.J. is arrested by the police. It becomes clear to P.J. that he has been set up by the Orbisons, who wanted to rid themselves of Grenoble and needed a fall guy.

P.J. is released by the authorities and makes it back to New York, where he confronts the masterminds of the plot. About all he can do is stand by as Orbison and his mistress end up doing away with one another.

Cast

Production
The film was originally called Criss Cross. Peppard's casting was announced in November 1966. John Guillermin agreed to direct shortly afterwards. In January 1967, Gayle Hunnicutt was cast as the female lead. She made the film under a non-exclusive two-picture deal with Universal.

Filming started in January 1967. It was reported that Peppard's earnings for four films he made for Universal—this, Tobruk, Rough Night in Jericho, and What's So Bad About Feeling Good?—came to $1.6 million plus percentages. Raymond Burr and Peppard purportedly clashed at first but then got along. The film's title was changed to New Face in Hell then in September 1967, the title was changed from New Face in Hell to PJ.

Reception
The Chicago Tribune called it "routine". The New York Times called it "fun". A reviewer for FilmInk wrote, "[the film] seems to have been made with one eye on being a new Harper (1966) – only it doesn't have Ross MacDonald, William Goldman, an all star cast or Paul Newman ...  George Peppard is an ideal private eye but the film seems unsure how tough or comic to make his character – one minute he's a clown, the next a smart arse, the next a tough guy, the next someone who gets beaten up by patrons of a leather bar."

Home media
Kino Lorber released the film in North America on DVD and Blu-ray on October 6, 2020.

See also
 List of American films of 1968

References

External links
 
 
 
 

1968 films
1960s American films
1960s English-language films
1960s mystery films
American detective films
American mystery films
American neo-noir films
Films directed by John Guillermin
Films scored by Neal Hefti
Films set in New York City
Films set in the Bahamas
Films shot in New York City
Universal Pictures films